Salmostoma belachi is a species of ray-finned fish in the genus Salmostoma.

References 

 

belachi
Fish described in 1999
Taxobox binomials not recognized by IUCN